Gerard Jan Henk van Gelder FBA (born 10 June 1947) is a Dutch academic who was the Laudian Professor of Arabic at the University of Oxford from 1998 to 2012.

Life
After completing his secondary education at the Vossius Gymnasium Amsterdam, Van Gelder studied at the University of Amsterdam, then worked as Librarian at the Institute for the Modern Near East at the University from 1973 to 1975.  He was Lecturer in Arabic at the University of Groningen from 1975 to 1998, gaining a doctorate from the University of Leiden in 1982.  He was appointed as a member of the Royal Netherlands Academy of Arts and Sciences in 1994. He moved to the University of Oxford in 1998 to take up the position of Laudian Professor of Arabic, becoming a Fellow of St John's College, Oxford. He became a Fellow of the British Academy in 2005.  His publications include Beyond the Line: classical Arabic literary critics on the coherence and unity of the poem (1982) and Close Relationships: incest and inbreeding in classical Arabic literature (2005).

References

External links
 Oxford web-profile

1947 births
Living people
Dutch librarians
Van Gelder, Gerard Jan
Members of the Royal Netherlands Academy of Arts and Sciences
University of Amsterdam alumni
Leiden University alumni
Academic staff of the University of Groningen
Van Gelder, Gerard Jan
Van Gelder, Gerard Jan
Writers from Amsterdam